Ahmadabad (also Romanized as Aḩmadābād; also known as Aḩmadābād-e Şafī Khānī) is a village in Khesht Rural District, Khesht District, Kazerun County, Fars Province, Iran. At the 2006 census, its population was 113, in 24 families.

References 

Populated places in Kazerun County